The 2009 Rafael Nadal tennis season officially began on January 5 with the start of the 2009 ATP World Tour.

Year's summary

Qatar Open
Nadal's first official ATP tour event for the year was the 250 series Qatar Open in Doha. After his first-round match with Fabrice Santoro, Nadal was awarded the 2008 ATP World Tour Champion trophy.  Nadal eventually lost in the quarterfinals to Gaël Monfils. Nadal also entered and won the tournament's doubles event with partner Marc López, defeating the world No. 1 doubles team of Daniel Nestor and Nenad Zimonjić in the final. As noted by statistician Greg Sharko, this was the first time since 1990 the world No. 1 singles player had played the world No. 1 doubles player in a final.

Australian Open
At the 2009 Australian Open, Nadal won his first five matches without dropping a set, before defeating compatriot Fernando Verdasco in the semifinals in the second longest match in Australian Open history at 5 hours and 14 minutes. This win set up a championship match with Roger Federer, their first meeting ever in a hard-court Grand Slam tournament and their nineteenth meeting overall. Nadal defeated Federer in five sets to earn his first hard-court Grand Slam singles title, making him the first Spaniard to win the Australian Open and the fourth male tennis player—after Jimmy Connors, Mats Wilander, and Andre Agassi—to win Grand Slam singles titles on three different surfaces. This win also made Nadal the first male tennis player to hold three Grand Slam singles titles on three different surfaces at the same time.

ABN AMRO World Tennis Tournament
At the ABN AMRO World Tennis Tournament in Rotterdam, Nadal lost in the final to second-seeded Andy Murray in three sets. During the final, Nadal called a trainer to attend to a tendon problem with his right knee, which notably affected his play in the final set. Although this knee problem was not associated with Nadal's right knee tendonitis, it was serious enough to cause him to withdraw from the Barclays Dubai Tennis Championships a week later.

Davis Cup
In March, Nadal helped Spain defeat Serbia in a Davis Cup World Group first-round tie on clay in Benidorm, Spain. Nadal defeated Janko Tipsarević and Novak Djokovic. The win over world No. 3 Djokovic was Nadal's twelfth consecutive Davis Cup singles match win and boosted his career win–loss record against Djokovic to 11–4, including 6–0 on clay.

Indian Wells
At the 2009 Indian Wells Masters, Nadal won his thirteenth Masters 1000 series tournament. In the fourth round, Nadal saved five match points, before defeating David Nalbandian for the first time. Nadal defeated Juan Martín del Potro in the quarterfinals and Andy Roddick in the semifinals, before defeating Murray in the final.

Miami
The next ATP tour event was the 2009 Miami Masters. Nadal advanced to the quarterfinals, where he again faced Argentinian del Potro, this time losing the match. This was the first time del Potro had defeated Nadal in five career matches.

Monte Carlo
Nadal began his European clay court season at the 2009 Monte Carlo Masters, where he won a record fifth consecutive singles title there. He defeated Novak Djokovic in the final for his fifth consecutive win, a record in the open era. Nadal is the first male player to win the same ATP Master series event for five consecutive years.

Barcelona
Nadal then competed in the ATP 500 event in Barcelona. He advanced to his fifth consecutive Barcelona final, where he faced David Ferrer. Nadal went on to beat Ferrer to record five consecutive Barcelona victories.

Rome
At the Rome Masters, Nadal reached the final, where he defeated Novak Djokovic to improve his overall record to 13–4 and clay record to 8–0 against the Serb. He became the first player to win four Rome titles.

After winning two clay-court Masters, he participated in the Madrid Open. He lost to Roger Federer in the final. This was the first time that Nadal had lost to Federer since the semifinals of the 2007 Tennis Masters Cup.

On 19 May, the ATP World Tour announced that Nadal was the first player out of eight to qualify for the 2009 ATP World Tour Finals, to be played at the O2 Arena in London.

French Open
By beating Lleyton Hewitt in the third round of 2009 French Open, Nadal (2005–09 French Open) set a record of 31 consecutive wins at Roland Garros, beating the previous record of 28 by Björn Borg (1978–81 French Open). Nadal had won 32 consecutive sets at Roland Garros (since winning the last 2 sets at the 2007 French Open final against Federer), the second-longest winning streak in the tournament's history behind Björn Borg's record of 41 consecutive sets. This run came to an end on 31 May 2009, when Nadal lost to eventual runner-up, Robin Söderling in the 4th round in a massive upset. This was Nadal's first loss at the French Open.

Injury
After his surprise defeat at Roland Garros, Nadal withdrew from the AEGON Championships. It was confirmed that Nadal was suffering from tendinitis in both of his knees. On 19 June, Nadal withdrew from the 2009 Wimbledon Championship, citing his recurring knee injury. He was the first champion not to defend the title since Goran Ivanišević in 2001. Roger Federer went on to win the title, and Nadal consequently dropped back to world No. 2 on 6 July 2009. Nadal later announced his withdrawal from the Davis Cup.

Return
On 4 August, Nadal's uncle, Toni Nadal, confirmed that Nadal would return to play at the Rogers Cup in Montreal. There, in his first tournament since Roland Garros, Nadal lost in the quarterfinals to Juan Martín del Potro. With this loss, he relinquished the No. 2 spot to Andy Murray on 17 August 2009, ranking outside the top two for the first time since 25 July 2005.

US Open
In the quarterfinals of the US Open he defeated Fernando González in a rain-delayed encounter. However, like his previous US Open campaign, he fell in the semifinals, this time losing to eventual champion Juan Martín del Potro. Despite the loss, he regained the No. 2 ranking after Andy Murray's early exit.

World Tour Finals
At the World Tour Finals, Nadal lost all three of his matches against Robin Söderling, Nikolay Davydenko, and Novak Djokovic respectively without winning a set.

Davis Cup final
In December, Nadal participated in the second Davis Cup final of his career. He defeated Tomáš Berdych in his first singles rubber to give the Spanish Davis Cup Team their first point in the tie. After the Spanish Davis Cup team had secured its fourth Davis Cup victory, Nadal defeated Jan Hájek in the first Davis Cup dead rubber of his career. The win gave Nadal his 14th consecutive singles victory at Davis Cup (his 13th on clay).

Year end ranking
Nadal finished the year as No. 2 for the fourth time in five years.

All matches

Singles

Source (ATP)

Exhibition matches

Doubles

Source (ATP)

See also
 2009 ATP World Tour
 2009 Roger Federer tennis season
 2009 Novak Djokovic tennis season
 2009 Juan Martín del Potro tennis season

References

External links 
 
ATP tour profile

2009
Nadal